INSEAD (Institut européen d'administration des affaires) has more than 50,000 alumni worldwide, comprising more than 150 nationalities.

Academia
Julie Battilana, PhD, the Joseph C. Wilson Professor of Business Administration at Harvard Business School and the Alan L. Gleitsman Professor of Social Innovation at the Harvard Kennedy School.

Finance
Meera Sanyal, MBA, Former CEO of Royal Bank of Scotland, India
Tidjane Thiam, MBA, Former CEO at Credit Suisse and Prudential.
Henry Engelhardt, MBA, CEO, Admiral Group
Philip Hampton, MBA, Former Chairman, J Sainsbury; Royal Bank of Scotland Group
Andrew Large, MBA, Former Deputy Governor, Bank of England
Paul Marshall, co-founder and chairman, Marshall Wace
António Horta Osório, MBA, Former CEO at Lloyds Banking Group and former Chairman at Credit Suisse
Miguel Pais do Amaral, Entrepreneur, Quifel Holdings
Huw van Steenis, Head of European Financials Services Research, Morgan Stanley
Driss Ben-Brahim, Special Situations, GLG Partners
Niall Wass COO at Wonga.com
Andrea Orcel, former CEO, Banco Santander, CEO, UniCredit
Karien van Gennip, CEO - France, ING
Lucy Quist, managing director and Head of Change Leadership, Morgan Stanley
Sam Woods, Deputy Governor of the Bank of England and Chief Executive of the PRA.
Vikram J Varma, banking professional

Industry
Christopher Harborne, CEO of Sherriff Global Group 
Jessica Uhl, CFO, Royal Dutch Shell
Samir Arora, CEO & Chairman, NetObjects
Niels B. Christiansen, CEO, The Lego Group
Paul Desmarais, Jr., chairman and Co-CEO, Power Corporation of Canada
Baron Robert Gillespie of Blackhall, OBE (born 1947), industrialist and author
Yvonne Greenstreet, chief executive officer of Alnylam Pharmaceuticals
Philippe Harache, Former deputy CEO, Eurocopter
Franz Humer, chairman, Diageo
Marius Kloppers, Former CEO, BHP
Gary Wang, Founder and Former CEO Tudou
Sam Laidlaw, CEO, Centrica
Helge Lund, Former CEO, Statoil and Aker Kværner, CEO, BG Group
Sir Lindsay Owen-Jones, Former Chairman and current non-executive chairman, L'Oreal
Kevin P. Ryan, Co-founder & Former CEO, DoubleClick, CEO, Gilt Groupe
Lord Simon of Highbury, Former Chairman and CEO, BP
Roustam Tariko, Founder & President, Russian Standard
Noel Tata, managing director, Tata International
Sebastian James, CEO, Boots
Tom Adams, Former Chairman & CEO, Rosetta Stone
Erik Wachtmeister, Founder, aSmallWorld
Jeff Goldstein, President, PriceGrabber
Fernando Zobel de Ayala, President & COO, Ayala Corporation
Peter Záboji
Carolyn Fairbairn, Director-General, Confederation of British Industry
Egil Hogna , President & CEO, Sapa Group
Bernard Broermann, Founder, Asklepios Kliniken
Joshua Oigara, CEO, KCB Group
Finn Rausing, Co-Owner, Tetra Laval
Antoine Arnault, CEO, Berluti, and chairman, Loro Piana
Said Darwazah, CEO and chairman, Hikma Pharmaceuticals
Luca Desiata, CEO, SOGIN
Börje Ekholm, CEO, Ericsson
Barney Harford, COO, Uber
Bob van Dijk, CEO, Naspers
Wolfgang Marguerre, chairman, Octapharma
Andreas Jacobs, Owner, Barry Callebaut via Jacobs Holding
Ben Keswick, Executive Chairman, Jardine Matheson
Enrico Cesenni, founder and CEO, Asia Strategic Holdings

Nonprofit, law and government
Johann Schneider-Ammann, President of Switzerland
William Hague, Former Leader, Conservative Party (UK), Former First Secretary of State and Secretary of State for Foreign & Commonwealth Affairs of the UK.
Bill Morneau, Finance Minister, Government of Canada
Will Hutton, former Principal, Hertford College, Oxford
Jan Jananayagam, co-founder, Tamils Against Genocide
Jo Johnson, Former Minister of State, Member of Parliament Conservative Party (UK)
Jussi Pajunen, Mayor of Helsinki
Jusuf Kalla, former Vice President of Indonesia
Wolf Klinz, Member of the European Parliament
Conor Lenihan, former Irish Minister of State
Najib Mikati, Prime Minister of Lebanon
Elena Panaritis, Member of Greek parliament
Sam Rainsy, Member of Parliament of Cambodia 
Tioulong Saumura, Member of Parliament of Cambodia 
Prince Jean of Luxembourg
Prince Friso of Orange-Nassau
Prince Constantijn of the Netherlands
Perry Lim, Chief of Defence Force (Singapore)
Jovita Carranza, 26th Administrator of the Small Business Administration
Wopke Hoekstra, Deputy Prime Minister of the Netherlands
Lucy Quist, President of African Institute of Mathematical Sciences, Ghana

Services
Colin Dyer, CEO, JLL
Philip Hampton, chairman, J Sainsbury former Group Finance Director, Lloyds TSB, BT Group and British Steel Corporation
Arthur Sadoun, CEO, Publicis
Yves-Michel Marti, pioneer in Competitive Intelligence, CEO of The Baconian Company and Magentine

Media
Peter Fudakowski, 2006 Academy Award Winner for Best Foreign Film
Kelvin Teo, Winner of Reality Show Love Me Do Season 1
Gunnar Dedio, Founder and CEO, LOOKSfilm

Sports
Andrew Noble 2010 Winter Olympics Alpine Skiing

References